Stephen Frampton (born 1969 in Waterford) is an Irish sportsperson.  He played hurling with his local club Ballygunner and with the Waterford senior inter-county team.

Playing career

Club
Frampton played for his local club Ballygunner.  In a long career, Frampton won 8 Waterford Senior Hurling Championships and a Munster Senior Club Hurling Championship in 2001.

Inter County
Frampton made his debut against Cork on 3 June 1990 in the Munster Senior Hurling Championship semi-final.  Waterford were heavily beaten on this occasion.  Frampton's came closest to winning silverware in 1998 when Waterford drew against Clare in the Munster Hurling Final.  Waterford subsequently lost in the replay.  Frampton's final championship appearance came against Limerick on 10 June 2001.  Frampton trained with the Waterford panel at the start of 2002 but decided to retire after being an unused substitute in a Waterford Crystal Cup match.  Sadly for Frampton, Waterford later went on to win the Munster Senior Hurling Championship in June of that year.

Personal life
Frampton went to school at De La Salle College and played hurling and football with the school.  Frampton currently works for WLR FM as a match day commentator alongside Kieran O'Connor.

Championship Appearances

References

1969 births
Living people
Ballygunner hurlers
Waterford inter-county hurlers
Hurling selectors